The Presque Isle Light, historically nicknamed the "Flash Light", is a lighthouse on the shore of Lake Erie in U.S. state of Pennsylvania. It is one of three lighthouses in Erie, along with the Erie Land Light and the North Pier Light. The lighthouse is situated on the northern shoreline of Presque Isle State Park overlooking the beach.

The lighthouse was opened in 1873 and was listed on the National Register of Historic Places in 1983.

Design 
Up until August 2013, a backup, emergency light was mounted below the main beacon that would flash every 10 seconds at a "reduced intensity" if the main beacon was non-operational. Around the same time as the removal of the emergency light, the main beacon was replaced with a six-tier, light-emitting diode, Vega marine beacon.

The lighthouse tower is attached a four-bedroom residence used by the lighthouse keeper. The whale oil and, eventually, kerosene necessary to keep the lighthouse illuminated for the entire night was stored in the room at the base of the stairs leading to the lantern room. For safety reasons, the rest of the fuel was stored in a shed located elsewhere on the property. After it was electrified, the oil room became the storage room for the batteries powering the light.

History 
In 1789, the United States Congress authorized the federal government to construct and maintain lighthouses and other navigational aids on the nation's waterways, as well as established the predecessor to the United States Lighthouse Service. The first two U.S. lighthouses on the Great Lakes were completed in 1818—one in Buffalo, New York and the Erie Land Light at the entrance to Presque Isle Bay. Ownership of the Presque Isle peninsula that formed the bay was transferred from a sailors' hospital to the federal government on May 17, 1871 "for the purposes of national defense and the protection of the harbor of Erie". By that time, the continuously shifting sands of Presque Isle had caused the peninsula to migrate and had begun to obscure mariners' views of the Land Light. Congress quickly appropriated $15,000 for the construction of a new " on the north side of Presque Isle" on June 10, 1872.

Construction 

Construction on the lighthouse was delayed until September 2, 1872 after the Lighthouse Board solicited bids and initially received none. Part of the problem lie in the relative isolation of Presque Isle, which would prove notoriously difficult to deliver building materials. No roads connected it to the mainland and, at times in its history, the peninsula would become an island. Originally, barges could be offloaded at the closest point to the lighthouse from Lake Erie. After one foundered in a storm and lost 6,000 bricks, the only recourse was to land on the bay-side and carry everything  to the lighthouse site. The masonry of both of lighthouse tower and keeper's residence were completed by November 1873. Work was halted for the winter on December 2 and did not resume until April 16, 1873. The Presque Isle Light was completed on July 1, 1873.

Once finished, a fourth-order Fresnel lens was installed in the tower, and it went into operation on July 12—Charles Waldo, the Presque Isle Light's first keeper, noted in the log for that day: "This is a new light station and the light will be exhibited for the first time tonight. There was one visitor." The lighthouse originally produced a fixed, white light which flashed red every 60 seconds. In 1882, it was given a new set of lens and its characteristic was changed to an alternating red and white flash every 10 seconds. This signal pattern led the lighthouse to becoming nicknamed the "Flash Light" by Erie residents. It took one month—from August 19 to September 18, 1896—for bricklayers to extend to the tower.

Electrification and automation 
A single, 150-watt, incandescent light bulb illuminated the lighthouse beacon; it was visible up to  after it was magnified by its Fresnel lens to 120,000 candlepower.
In 1962, the lighthouse's Fresnel lens was removed and replaced with a modern aviation beacon. At that time, the characteristic was changed to its current isophase light.

The Presque Isle Light was added to the National Register of Historic Places on August 4, 1983, as part of a group listing of lighthouses and light stations operated by the United States Coast Guard on the Great Lakes. The lighthouse was one of 17 declared government surplus by the Coast Guard in January 1997, and ownership of the Presque Isle Light was taken over by the Pennsylvania Department of Conservation and Natural Resources.

Restoration 
On July 25, 2014, the Department of Conservation and Natural Resources transferred the Presque Isle Light, in a 35-year lease to a nonprofit organization charged with restoring and operating the lighthouse as a museum. The lighthouse was reopened to the public for tours in the summer of 2015. Renovations will see the 1989-additions, as well as most of the modern amenities, removed to return the lighthouse to its appearance in the late-1800s and early-1900s. The lighthouse is depicted on an optional "special organization" Pennsylvania license plate benefiting the Presque Isle Partnership.

Keepers and residents 

When the Presque Isle Light opened, its first keepers were paid $520 per year, and were entitled to use the "snug" residence attached to the lighthouse.

From 1974 to 1986, the Coast Guard used the Presque Isle Light as supplemental housing and assigned it to personnel and their families. As it was fully automated, guardsmen housed at the light were only required to inspect the beacon during "unusual electrical storms." After its last residents vacated the lighthouse in June 1986 and, rather than constantly repair it, the Coast Guard chose to close the keeper's residence. The Pennsylvania Department of Conservation and Natural Resources opted to house state park officials in the lighthouse until 2014.

See also 
 List of lighthouses in the United States
 National Register of Historic Places listings in Erie County, Pennsylvania

References

Sources

Further reading

External links 

 
 
 Presque Isle (Lake Erie) Light (Amateur Radio Lighthouse Society)

Buildings and structures in Erie County, Pennsylvania
Lighthouses completed in 1873
Historic American Buildings Survey in Pennsylvania
Houses on the National Register of Historic Places in Pennsylvania
Lighthouses on the National Register of Historic Places in Pennsylvania
Tourist attractions in Erie County, Pennsylvania
Towers completed in 1873